Beatrix Runs is the major label debut album by singer-songwriter Elizaveta Khripounova, known professionally as Elizaveta. It was released digitally on iTunes Store and Amazon MP3 on January 24, 2012.

Track listing
 "Dreamer" – 3:18
 "Meant" – 4:33
 "Armies of Your Heart" – 3:08
 "Snow in Venice" – 3:28
 "Nightflyers" – 3:15
 "Orion" – 3:44
 "Beatrix Runs" – 3:26
 "Odi et Amo" – 4:34
 "Victory" – 4:34
 "Goodbye Song" – 4:18

Personnel
 Elizaveta Khripounova – Piano, Vocals, and Keyboard.
 Greg Wells – Producer, mixer.

Charts

References

2012 albums
Universal Republic Records albums
Pop albums by American artists
Albums produced by Greg Wells